Balian of Ibelin (1240–1302), seneschal of Cyprus, was a son of Guy of Ibelin, constable of Cyprus, and Philippa Berlais.

He married Alice of Hetumids of Lampron, daughter of Escive de Poitiers (daughter of Raymond-Roupen) and they had:
 Guy d'Ibelin (1286–1308), Lord of Nicosia.
 Marie d'Ibelin married Rupen de Montfort in 1299.
 Isabelle d'Ibelin, married John, titular lord of Arsuf.
 Margaret d'Ibelin, married Oshin of Korikos.

1240 births
1302 deaths
House of Ibelin
Christians of the Crusades